Somebody's Stolen Our Russian Spy or  O.K. Yevtushenko (the film shot the same year as O.K. Connery) is a 1967 Spanish/British international co-production Eurospy film shot in Spain and Portugal. The film was co-produced by James Ward and directed, co-written and co-produced by José Luis Madrid. The film stars Tom Adams in his third and final appearance as British secret agent Charles Vine. The film was shot in Spain instead of the usual UK location. When Embassy Pictures chose not to release it, the film languished in a film laboratory until 1976.

Plot
In Madrid, top Soviet Agent Colonel Yevtushenko is kidnapped off a yacht by the Albanian Secret Service and a Red Chinese agent. Their scheme is to obtain information out of him, then kill him blaming the British Secret Service. The U.K. sends in Charles Vine from Portugal, but Vine is captured and taken to the People's Socialist Republic of Albania along with Yevtushenko.

Cast
 Tom Adams as Charles Vine
 Barta Barri as Colonel Yevtushenko
 Tim Barrett as Major Kovacs
 Diana Lorys as Galina Samarav
 Mary Paz Pondal as Sara
 Antonio Molino Rojo as Gen. Borodin
 María Silva as Pandora Loz
 Eric Chapman as Potts
 Tito García as Captain Milhavikah
 José Riesgo as Col. Stenhoff
 Gene Reyes as Ly Chee
 José María Labernié as Muffin-Wells 
 Antonio Jiménez Escribano as Rockwell

References

External links
 
 

1967 films
1960s English-language films
English-language Spanish films
Spanish spy comedy films
British spy comedy films
1960s spy comedy films
Cold War spy films
Films shot in Spain
Films shot in Portugal
Films set in Albania
1960s British films